Al-Badria  is a Syrian village located in Ariha Nahiyah in Ariha District, Idlib.  According to the Syria Central Bureau of Statistics (CBS), Al-Badria had a population of 84 in the 2004 census.

References 

Villages in Idlib Governorate
Populated places in Ariha District